Arna micronides is a species of moth in the family Erebidae. It is a pest of millets in India.

References

Lymantriinae
Insect pests of millets